Miguel Faria Jr. (born 28 September 1944) is a Brazilian film director and screenwriter. He directed 13 films between 1969 and 2005.

Selected filmography
 Mortal Sin (1970)
 A Samba for Sherlock (2001)

References

External links

1944 births
Living people
Brazilian film directors
Brazilian screenwriters
Writers from Rio de Janeiro (city)